Christopher Snode (born 23 March 1959) is a former World Cup Champion diver who represented Great Britain and England.

Diving career
He represented Great Britain at the 1976 Summer Olympics, 1980 Summer Olympics, and 1984 Summer Olympics.  He represented England at the 1978 and 1982 Commonwealth Games, and won four gold medals. Snode was the University of Florida's first individual NCAA National Champion (1978). At the first-ever FINA Diving World Cup held in The Woodlands, Texas in 1979, Snode became World Cup Champion in the men's three-metres springboard event.

Snode attended the University of Florida in Gainesville, Florida, where he dove for the Florida Gators swimming and diving team in National Collegiate Athletic Association (NCAA) competition from 1977 to 1980.  He was recognized as the Southeastern Conference Diver of the Year three consecutive years, received six All-American honors, and was Florida's first individual NCAA National  champion (three-metres springboard event in 1978).  Snode graduated from the university with a bachelor's degree in fine arts in 1981, and was inducted in the University of Florida Athletic Hall of Fame as a "Gator Great" in 1993.

Snode was a member of the British Olympic team in 1976, 1980 and 1984; he placed among the top ten divers in the world in both platform and springboard diving at the 1980 Summer Olympics in Moscow and the 1984 Olympics in Los Angeles.  He was the three-metres springboard and ten-metres platform diving champion at the 1978 Commonwealth Games in Edmonton, and again in both events at the 1982 Commonwealth Games in Brisbane.

Since the early 1990s, Snode has been recognised as a leading Casting Director for sports TV commercials airing worldwide. His casting agency Chris Snode Casting has worked with a variety of award-winning directors and producers. In 2016 TV commercials he cast won 26 awards across three continents. Snode is also an Olympic television commentator and diving pundit for the BBC and Euro Sport (1988 to present).  Snode was the executive diving consultant in the USA on Eyework's "Splash" reality programme that premiered on ABC, March 19, 2013.

During the COVID-19 period from March 2020 onwards, with no TV or Film work to sustain him, Snode returned to fine art producing 45 large oil on canvas olympic sports paintings in abstract and a second collection of 20 water themed paintings. In July 2021 he open a gallery in Crystal Palace, South London, to display and sell his work. Chris Snode Artist    Exhibited artwork at the UTR art exhibition in Bluewater Feb - March 2023

Honours and recognition 
 Great Britain's first World Diving Champion 1979 
 University of Florida's first NCAA National Champion (individual) 1978 
 University of Florida Hall of Fame, inducted as a Gator Great 1993 
 Swim England's George Hearn Cup - Honoured a record eight times 1975, 1978 to 1984 
 Nominated for Equity / CDA Diversity TV Commercial Casting Award 2016
Nominate best casting of feature film (Feature 83) - Runner up CDA award

See also 

 List of University of Florida alumnid 
 List of University of Florida Athletic Hall of Fame members
 List of University of Florida Olympians

References 

1959 births
Living people
Divers at the 1976 Summer Olympics
Divers at the 1980 Summer Olympics
Divers at the 1984 Summer Olympics
Florida Gators men's swimmers
Olympic divers of Great Britain
People from Sutton, London
Divers at the 1978 Commonwealth Games
Divers at the 1982 Commonwealth Games
English male divers
Commonwealth Games gold medallists for England
Commonwealth Games medallists in diving
Competitors at the 1981 Summer Universiade
Medallists at the 1978 Commonwealth Games
Medallists at the 1982 Commonwealth Games